Shedim (singular:  Sheyd) are spirits or demons in the Tanakh and Jewish mythology. They do not, however, correspond exactly to the modern conception of demons as evil entities, originated from Christanity. Evil spirits were thought to be the cause of maladies; differing conceptually from the shedim, who were, not evil demigods, but the gods of foreigners. Shedim are not necessarily evil - i.e. inherently evil only in the sense that they are not God.

They appear only twice (and in both instances in the plural) in the Tanakh, at Psalm 106:37 and Deuteronomy 32:17. In both instances, the text deals with child sacrifice or animal sacrifice. Although the word is traditionally derived from the root  ( shûd) that conveys the meaning of "acting with violence" or "laying waste," it was possibly a loan-word from Akkadian in which the word shedu referred to a spirit which could be either protective or malevolent. With the translation of Hebrew texts into Greek, under the influence of Zoroastrian dualism, the term shedim was translated into Greek as daimonia with implicit connotations of negativity. Later, in Judeo-Islamic culture, shedim became the Hebrew word for Jinn conveying the morally ambivalent attitude of these beings.

Origin 
According to one legend, the shedim are the descendants of serpents, or of demons in serpent form, in allusion to the story of the serpent in Eden, as related in Genesis. 
A second view is that they are the offspring of Lilith, from her union with Adam or other men, while a third says that God created them on the sixth day, starting to fashion their bodies but failing to complete the work because he was obliged to rest on the Sabbath. Even after the Sabbath, he left them as they were, in order to show that, when the Sabbath comes, all work still unfinished at the beginning of the Sabbath must afterward be viewed as complete. As a result, the shedim have souls like those of humans, but lack the bodies to contain them.
Yet a fourth conception was that the shedim had their origins among the builders of the Tower of Babel - these being divided by their motivations into three groups, of which the third and worst comprised those who sought actively to wage war against God and were punished for their sacrilegious hubris by transformation into the shedim.
Finally, the Zohar describes them as offspring of the demons Azazel and Naamah.

Traits 
The Talmud describes the shedim as possessing some traits of angels, and some traits of humans:

According to Rashi, shedim, like lillin but unlike ruchos, have human form, although no human body. They eat and drink as humans do.

They can cause sickness and misfortune, follow the dead and fly around graves.

Supposedly, sinful people sacrificed their daughters to the shedim, but it is unclear if the sacrifice consisted in the murdering of the victims or in the sexual satisfaction of the demons.

There are many things that one is admonished not to do in order to avoid invoking the shedim, such as whistling or even saying the word "shedim". The 12th century mystic Judah ben Samuel of Regensburg wrote in his will and testament that one should not seal up windows completely because it traps shedim in the house.

The shedim are not always seen as malicious creatures and are also considered to be helpful to humans. They are said to be even able to live according to the Torah, like Asmodeus.

Conjuring shedim is not necessarily forbidden, depending on whether the theologian discussing the topic views such summoning to constitute sorcery. Even if summoning shedim is an act of sorcery and thus forbidden, consulting shedim conjured by a non-Jew would be permissible.

Appearance 

Shedim are said to have had the feet and claws of a rooster. To see if the shedim were present, ashes were thrown to the ground or floor, which rendered their footsteps visible.

Shedim can shapeshift, sometimes assuming a human form, the Talmud telling of the sheyd Asmodeus assuming King Solomon's form and actually ruling in his place for a time, although he had to take care never to be seen barefoot, because he could not disguise his clawed feet.

In the Zohar:

See also
 Asmodeus
 Daemon (classical mythology)
 Dybbuk
 Jinn
 Fairy
 Lamassu (Shedu)
 Mazzikin
 Se'irim
 Shdum

References

Further reading
 Ben-Amos, Dan. "On Demons." In Creation and Re-creation in Jewish Thought: Festschrift in Honor of Joseph Dan on the Occasion of His Seventieth Birthday. Mohr Siebeck, 2005, pp. 27–38, limited preview online.
 Charles, R.H. The Apocalypse of Baruch, Translated from the Syriac. Originally published 1896, Book Tree edition 2006 online.
 Charles, R.H. The Apocrypha and Pseudepigrapha of the Old Testament, vol. 2: Pseudepigrapha. Originally published 1913, Apocryphile Press Edition 2004, p. 485 online and p. 497.
 Chajes, Jeffrey Howard. Between Worlds: Dybbuks, Exorcists, and Early Modern Judaism. University of Pennsylvania Press, 2003, pp. 11–13 online.
 Goldish, Matt. Spirit Possession in Judaism. Wayne State University Press, 2003, p. 356 online.
 Heiser, Michael S. 2015. The Unseen Realm: Recovering the Supernatural Worldview of the Bible. 
 Koén-Sarano, Matilda. King Solomon and the Golden Fish: Tales from the Sephardic Tradition. Translated by Reginetta Haboucha. Wayne State University Press, 2004. Limited preview online.
 Plaut, W. Gunther. The Torah: A Modern Commentary. Union for Reform Judaism, 2005, p. 1403 online.
 Walton, John H., and J. Harvey Walton. 2019. Demons and Spirits in Biblical Theology: Reading the Biblical Text in its Cultural and Literary Context.

External links 
 Elyonim veTachtonim. An on-line database of angels, demons, ghosts and monsters in the Bible and Babylonian Talmud.

Demons in Judaism
Jewish legendary creatures
Kabbalistic words and phrases
Psalms
Book of Deuteronomy
Daimons
Jinn